George Stephan (March 30, 1862 – September 9, 1944) was the 20th Lieutenant Governor of Colorado, serving from 1919 to 1921 under Oliver Henry Shoup. He was born in Cleveland, Ohio and died in La Jolla, California. Stepham was a Republican.

References

Lieutenant Governors of Colorado
1862 births
1944 deaths
Colorado Republicans
United States Attorneys for the District of Colorado